Love Spreads is a 2021 American-British comedy film written, directed, and produced by Jamie Adams. It stars Alia Shawkat, Eiza González, Chanel Cresswell, Nick Helm, Dolly Wells and Tara Lee.

The film premiered at the 2021 Tribeca Film Festival. It was previously scheduled to premier at the previous year's festival, however, the festival was cancelled due to the COVID-19 pandemic.

Cast
 Alia Shawkat as Kelly
 Eiza González as Patricia
 Chanel Cresswell as Jess
 Nick Helm as Mark
 Dolly Wells as Julie
 Tara Lee as Alice

References

External links
 
 

American comedy films
British comedy films
Films about music and musicians
2021 films
2021 comedy films
2020s English-language films
Films directed by Jamie Adams
2020s American films
2020s British films